Eran Cohen Groumi (born June 5, 1970, in Jerusalem) is a male former backstroke and butterfly swimmer from Israel.

His nephew is Israeli Olympic swimmer Gal Cohen Groumi.

Swimming career
Groumi competed for Israel at the 1989 Maccabiah Games, winning the 100 m and 200 m butterfly.

Groumi who competed for Israel at the 1992 Summer Olympics in Barcelona, Spain. At the 2017 Maccabiah Games, in the special 4x50m relay race between Israeli and American all-star teams, American Olympic champions Lenny Krayzelburg (four Olympic golds), Jason Lezak (four Olympic golds), and Anthony Ervin (three Olympic golds), with masters swimmer Alex Blavatnik, swam a time of 1:48.23 and defeated Israeli Olympians Groumi, Guy Barnea, Yoav Bruck, and Tal Stricker, who had a time of 1:51.25. 

Despite being of Israeli nationality he competed at the ASA National British Championships and won the 50 metres backstroke, the 100 metres backstroke in 1996  and the 100 metres butterfly title in 1996.

References

External links
 

1970 births
Living people
Israeli Jews
Israeli male swimmers
Olympic swimmers of Israel
Male backstroke swimmers
Male butterfly swimmers
Swimmers at the 1992 Summer Olympics
Jewish swimmers
Maccabiah Games competitors for Israel
Maccabiah Games swimmers 	
Maccabiah Games medalists in swimming	
Maccabiah Games gold medalists	
Competitors at the 1989 Maccabiah Games
Sportspeople from Jerusalem